The Senate of Bermuda is the upper house of the Parliament of Bermuda, the other being the House of Assembly. The Senate consists of eleven members appointed by the Governor for five-year terms — five Senators are nominated by the Premier, three by the Leader of the Opposition, and three appointed at the discretion of the Governor. Of the three appointed by the Governor, the Senate elects one to serve as the President, and another to serve as the Vice President.

The Senate serves as a house of review and serves as a road-block to constitutional change — the constitution requires a 2/3 super-majority (i.e., 8 votes) for a constitutional amendment, requiring the support of both the government and opposition appointees.

The presiding officer of the Senate is the President of the Senate. Carol Bassett, who has been a Senator since 2003, was elected President in 2008, the first woman elected to the office. She resigned the office in August 2017.

Current members
The members of the Senate appointed in August 2017 were:

The three Independents were: 
 Joan Dillas-Wright
 James Jardine
 Michelle Simmons

Government/PLP nominees:

 Anthony Richardson
 Jason Hayward
 Kathy Simmons
 Crystal Caesar, and 
 Vance Campbell.

Opposition/OBA nominees were:

 Nandi Outerbridge
 Nicholas Kempe, and 
 Andrew Simons.

History
Bermuda's Parliament was created in 1620, and originally had one house, the House of Assembly. Political parties were not legal, and the role now performed by the Senate was originally performed by an appointed council, called the Governor's Council, or Privy Council. The council also performed the role that today belongs to the Cabinet (the Cabinet is composed of Ministers appointed from elected Members of Parliament from the House of Assembly). Historically, the Council, composed of members of Bermuda's wealthy merchant class, had been the true centre of power, rather than the elected House of Assembly, or the Governor despatched from overseas. During periods when the colony was without a Governor, the President of the Council would be Acting Governor. The balance of power began to shift away from the Council in the 19th century, when Bermuda assumed a new importance in Imperial security, and when the Governor became also the Commander-in-Chief of the naval establishment and military garrison.

In May, 1888, the Privy Council was split into an Executive Council, which later became the Cabinet, and a Legislative Council, which became the upper house of Parliament (equivalent to the House of Lords in the Westminster Parliament), both with senior military and civil servants as members, and also with members appointed by the Governor from the House of Assembly. On the split, the President of the old Council, the Chief Justice of Bermuda (Sir Josiah Rees), became the President of the Legislative council.

In 1968, largely as a result of the civil rights movement, a new Constitution was introduced which made a number of changes to Bermuda's parliamentary system, making it more like the Westminster system. Political parties were legalised, and the system of a Responsible government, from which a Premier was appointed and the Cabinet Ministers were drawn, and a minority opposition was adopted. The property qualification was abolished and the system of suffrage, by which the members of the lower house were elected, and which had historically been limited to male landowners, was finally extended to all adults. The Executive Council was renamed the Cabinet in 1973, and is now formed from Members of the majority party in the House of Assembly. The Legislative Council was renamed the Senate of Bermuda in 1980, and is now composed of five Members recommended by the Premier, three by the Leader of the Opposition, and three by the Governor acting in his own discretion, all appointed by the Governor.

See also
 List of presidents of the Senate of Bermuda

References

Bermuda
Politics of Bermuda
Political organisations based in Bermuda
Bermuda